Tim Carter (born 1954) is an Australian musicologist with a special focus on late Renaissance music and Italian Baroque music. An active member of the field of musicology, Carter is a department chair at the University of North Carolina at Chapel Hill, where he holds the position of David G. Frey Distinguished Professor. He has worked on the editorial boards or staffs of a number of prominent musical publications and has published extensively in the field.

Career
Carter attended the universities of Durham and Birmingham. He has taught at various universities and served as department chair at Royal Holloway, University of London. In 2001, he took a position as Distinguished Professor and Chair in the music department of the University of North Carolina, Chapel Hill.

Carter has been actively involved in a number of music associations, including the Royal Musical Association, the American Musicological Society and the Society for Seventeenth-Century Music (SSCM). He stood as president of the SSCM from 2003 to 2006.

He has also been active in publication. In addition to editing and publishing various books and papers, he is active in several journals in his field. He served as the joint editor from 1992 to 1998 of the Oxford international journal Music & Letters. He is on the editorial boards of Journal of Seventeenth-Century Music, Early Music, Cambridge Opera Journal, Studi musicali toscani: ricerche e cataloghi and Cambridge Studies in Opera.

Bibliography
“Oklahoma!” The Making of an American Musical. (2007) New Haven and London: Yale University Press.
 “Musical Sources,” “The Venetian Madrigals,” and “Intermedio IV: Lamento della ninfa (1638).” In John Whenham and Richard Wistreich (eds.), The Cambridge Companion to Monteverdi. (2007) Cambridge, Cambridge University Press, pp. 20–30, 179–94, 195–98
“Tutto ’l dí piango…: Petrarch and the ‘New Music’ in Early Seventeenth-Century Italy.’ In Loredana Chines (ed.), Il Petrarchismo: un modello di poesia per l’Europa. (2006) Rome: Bulzoni, vol. 1.
The Cambridge History of Seventeenth-Century Music. (2005) Editors Tim Carter & John Butt. Cambridge: Cambridge University Press.
“L’editoria musicale tra Cinque e Seicento.” In Carlo Fiore (ed.), Il libro di musica: per una storia delle fonti musicali in Europa, “De charta,” 7.  (2004) Palermo: L’Epos, pp. 137–62
“In the Workshop of Rodgers and Hammerstein: New Light on Oklahoma!.” In C. Reardon and S. Parisi (eds), Music Observed: Studies in Memory of William C. Holmes. (2004) Warren, MI: Harmonie Park Press, pp. 55–64
“Che cosa è amor? Music and Love in Mozart’s Così fan tutte.” In B. Richardson et al. (eds.), Theatre, Opera, and Performance in Italy from the Fifteenth Century to the Present: Essays in Honour of Richard Andrews. ‘Occasional Papers of the Society for Italian Studies’, 6. (2004) Leeds: Society for Italian Studies, pp. 155–72
Monteverdi’s Musical Theatre. (2000)  New Haven and London: Yale University Press.
Monteverdi and his Contemporaries. (2000) “Variorum Collected Studies Series,” CS690. Aldershot: Ashgate.
Music, Patronage and Printing in Late Renaissance Florence. (2000) “Variorum Collected Studies Series,” CS682. Aldershot: Ashgate.
Music in Late Renaissance & Early Baroque Italy. (1992) London: Batsford (Portland, OR, Amadeus Press).

References

External links
Tim Carter, UNC profile

1954 births
Australian musicologists
Living people
Monteverdi scholars